María Teresa Méndez Mayo (born October 29, 1982 in Madrid) is an amateur Spanish wrestler, who played for the women's middleweight category. She won the bronze medal at the 2005 European Wrestling Championships in Varna, Bulgaria, and also, achieved a fifth-place finish at the 2006 World Wrestling Championships in Guangzhou, China.

Mendez qualified for the women's 63 kg class at the 2008 Summer Olympics in Beijing, after winning the silver medal from the Olympic Qualification Tournament in Edmonton, Alberta, Canada, losing out to Belarus' Volha Khilko. She lost the second preliminary match to France's Lise Golliot-Legrand, who was able to score a total of three points at the end of the second period.

References

External links
FILA Profile
NBC 2008 Olympics profile

Spanish female sport wrestlers
1982 births
Living people
Olympic wrestlers of Spain
Wrestlers at the 2008 Summer Olympics
Sportspeople from Madrid
20th-century Spanish women
21st-century Spanish women